KSVB 94.1 FM is a low-power FM radio station licensed to serve the communities located within the Big Bear Valley of California, which includes the communities of Big Bear City, Big Bear Lake, Fawnskin, Sugarloaf, Baldwin Lake, Erwin Lake, Holcomb Valley, Bluff Lake, and surrounding areas. In addition to terrestrial broadcasting, KSVB streams on TuneIn and Radio.Net.

KSVB airs a variety format consisting of "oldies and obscurities" - not the top 100, but music from the past, the B Sides, one hit wonders, rarities, and new artists.

The station was assigned the KSVB-LP call letters by the Federal Communications Commission on March 3, 2014.

KSVB is owned by Bear Valley Seniors and Veterans Assistance, Inc., a 501c(4) non-profit.

History 
KSVB was created to fill a void in radio entertainment. Lacking was a commercial free, all music station that did not focus on a particular genre but on 'oldies and obscurities' playing music from new artists and independent artists along with established artists. KSVB was created to fill this void and officially received its FCC broadcast license on April 28, 2017. 

KSVB is owned by Bear Valley Seniors and Veterans Assistance, Inc., hence the call letters KSVB -  K S[seniors] V[veterans] B[Big Bear].

References

External links
 Official Website
 
 KSVB on TuneIn
 KSVB on Radio.Net
 KSVB on Facebook
 KSVB on Twitter

SVB-LP
SVB-LP
Radio stations established in 2015
2015 establishments in California
Variety radio stations in the United States
San Bernardino County, California
